The Archdiocese of Koupéla is the Metropolitan See for the Ecclesiastical province of Koupéla in Burkina Faso.

History
 20 February 1956: Established as Diocese of Koupéla from the Metropolitan Archdiocese of Ouagadougou 
 5 December 2000: Promoted as Metropolitan Archdiocese of Koupéla

Special churches
The seat of the archbishop is Our Lady of Graces Cathedral in Koupéla.

Bishops

Ordinaries, in reverse chronological order
 Metropolitan Archbishops of Koupéla (Roman rite), below
 Archbishop Gabriel Sayaogo 7 December 2019 - present
 Archbishop Séraphin François Rouamba 5 December 2000  – 7 December 2019; see below
Bishops of Koupéla (Roman rite), below 
Bishop Séraphin François Rouamba 1 June 1995  – 5 December 2000; see above
Bishop Dieudonné Yougbaré 29 February 1956  – 1 June 1995

Other priests of this diocese who became bishops
Pierre Claver Malgo, appointed Bishop of Fada N’Gourma in 2012
Théophile Nare, appointed Bishop of Kaya in 2018

Suffragan Dioceses
 Dori
 Fada N’Gourma
 Kaya
 Tenkodogo

Sources
 GCatholic.org

Roman Catholic dioceses in Burkina Faso
 
Roman Catholic ecclesiastical provinces in Burkina Faso
Koupéla